St John the Evangelist's Church is in Toft Road, Toft, Cheshire, England.  It is an active Anglican parish church in the deanery of Knutsford, the archdeaconry of Macclesfield, and the diocese of Chester.  Its benefice is combined with that of St John the Baptist, Knutsford.  The church is recorded in the National Heritage List for England as a designated Grade II listed building.

History

The church was built between 1852 and 1855, and designed by William Gilbee Habershon.  It was paid for by Mrs Leycester of Toft Hall in memory of her husband.  Its chancel was intended for the use of the family, rather than for a choir.

Architecture

St John's is constructed in rubble stone with ashlar dressings, and has a tiled roof.  Its plan consists of a five-bay nave with a southwest porch, a north aisle, a chancel with a northeast vestry, and a southwest steeple.  Inside the church the arcade between the nave and the aisle is carried on alternate circular and octagonal piers.  Mrs Leycester was French, and commissioned the French artist Antoine Lusson to design the stained glass in the east window and in the other windows in the chancel.  These are dated 1853, and consist of quatrefoil scenes.  To celebrate the 2000 millennium, more stained glass windows were commissioned for the windows in the north aisle.  The two manual pipe organ was built in 1888 by C. Whiteley, and repaired in 1929 by Jardine and Company.

See also

Listed buildings in Toft, Cheshire

References

Church of England church buildings in Cheshire
Grade II listed churches in Cheshire
Churches completed in 1855
19th-century Church of England church buildings
Gothic Revival church buildings in England
Gothic Revival architecture in Cheshire
Diocese of Chester